List of the members of the Faroese Løgting in the period 2011–2015. The parliament had 33 members this period. The election for the Løgting was held on 29 October 2011. Seven political parties got representation in the parliament; People's Party and Union Party got 8 members each, Social Democratic Party and Republic got 6 members each, Centre Party and Progress got 2 members each and Self-Government Party got 1 member elected to the parliament. The Faroe Islands was one electoral district when this election took place. This was the second election with the new system with one electoral district. Before 2008 there were 7 electoral districts.

The government during this legislature was the Cabinet of Kaj Leo Johannesen II; a coalition of the Union Party, People's Party, Self-Government Party and Centre Party.

Personal votes

References

 2011
2011 in the Faroe Islands
2012 in the Faroe Islands
2013 in the Faroe Islands
2011-2015